Helenium thurberi is a North American plant in the sunflower family, commonly known as Thurber's sneezeweed. It is native to Mexico (Baja California Sur, Sinaloa, Nayarit, Chihuahua) and the southwestern United States (Arizona).

Leaves are lance-shaped. One plant can produce up to 120 flower heads, in a branching array. There are no ray flowers.

References

Flora of Mexico
Plants described in 1883
Flora of Arizona
thurberi